Jan Bogumił Rosen (16 October 1854 in Warsaw – 8 November 1936 in Warsaw) was a Polish painter of Jewish ancestry, known primarily for his battle scenes. His son was the muralist and mosaicist, Jan Henryk de Rosen.

Biography 
He was born to a wealthy Jewish family that had converted to Calvinism. Later, he  became  a Lutheran. As with many artists, he displayed an early talent for drawing and received his first lessons from Franciszek Kostrzewski.

From 1872 to 1875, he studied at the Academy of Fine Arts, Munich, then took private lessons at the school of battle painter Józef Brandt. His next four years were spent at the Académie des Beaux-Arts in Paris with Jean-Léon Gérôme and Isidore Pils.

He lived successively in Munich, Paris and Lausanne then, having a wife and newborn son to support, he settled in Russia in 1891, where he became a court painter to Alexander III; after the Tsar purchased his painting of Grand Duke Konstantin Pavlovich reviewing the Polish cavalry. In 1907 he made a trip to North Africa, followed by a visit to Scandinavia in 1908. He did not return to Poland until 1921, after the Polish-Soviet War.

He is best known for battle scenes, especially from the Napoleonic Wars, but also did  several works on the November Uprising prior to and after his residency in Russia. Horses were among his favorite motifs and he was known for the attention he paid to precise details in his uniforms and weapons. Some critics, however, thought his paintings were only good for teaching history.

References

External links 

ArtNet: More works by Rosen

1854 births
1936 deaths
19th-century Polish painters
19th-century Polish male artists
20th-century Polish painters
20th-century Polish male artists
Artists from Warsaw
Military art
Court painters
Equine artists
Polish male painters
Polish people of Jewish descent
Polish Lutherans